Parts: The Clonus Horror, also known as The Clonus Horror, or simply Clonus, is a 1979 science fiction horror film directed by Robert S. Fiveson, and stars Peter Graves, Tim Donnelly, Dick Sargent, Keenan Wynn, Paulette Breen and Frank Ashmore. The film is about an isolated community in a remote desert area, where clones are bred to serve as a source of replacement organs for the wealthy and powerful. The film was nominated at the 7th Saturn Awards in the category "Best Film Produced for Under $1,000,000".

Parts: The Clonus Horror was featured on the comedy television series Mystery Science Theater 3000 in 1997. In 2005, the filmmakers filed a lawsuit against DreamWorks Pictures for copyright infringement, citing numerous similarities between Clonus and The Island. The two parties reached a settlement, with the amount settled being seven-figures and other specific terms being court-sealed.

Plot
The film takes place in an isolated desert compound called Clonus, where clones are bred to be used as replacement parts for the elite, including a soon-to-be president-elect Jeffrey Knight (Peter Graves). The clones are kept isolated from the real world by workers of the colony, but are promised to be "accepted" to move to "America" after they have completed some type of physical training. After a group of clones are chosen to go to "America", they are given a party and a farewell celebration with their fellow clones. The chosen clones are then taken to a lab where they are sedated and placed in an airtight plastic bag, and their bodies are frozen in order to preserve their organs for harvest.

A clone Richard (Tim Donnelly) begins to question the circumstances of his existence and eventually escapes the colony. Pursued by compound guards, he enters a nearby city, where he is found by a retired journalist, Jake Noble (Keenan Wynn) and his wife. Jake takes him to Richard Knight, who is Richard's clone and the brother of Jeffrey Knight. The Knights argue over what to do with the clone (who is revealed to have been secretly commissioned by Jeffrey).

After a falling out, Richard's clone returns to the colony to reunite with his love interest, Lena (Paulette Breen). To his horror, the clone finds that Lena has been lobotomized by those running the colony. They had used her as bait to trap the Richard clone. Once they have him in custody, they kill and freeze him. Meanwhile, Clonus completes its cover-up by sending thugs to murder Richard Knight, his son, and the Nobles. Jeffrey Knight is stabbed through the chest in the ensuing struggle with his brother, but he appears fine the next day at a press conference, where he is stunned to find that Noble had, before his death, managed to disseminate a secret tape to the news media, exposing the Clonus project. The final shot shows Richard's frozen corpse with an open chest and a tear coming out of his eye.

Cast

Production
Parts: The Clonus Horror was written by Bob Sullivan. The idea for the script came while Sullivan was taking a screenwriting class at the University of Southern California. The class was taught by Irwin Blacker, a story editor for Bonanza. The movie was directed by Sullivan's classmate Robert Fiveson. Production began in Southern California in September 1978 with a budget of $350,000. In exchange for making a donation to the Junior Chamber of Commerce, the town of Simi Valley, California was rented for the picture. Students from a local college received class credit for working on the film. On-screen credit was given to people who offered the production crew dinner, tennis shoes, and bicycles.

The original title Robert Fiveson intended was "Clonus". The film distributor meanwhile wanted it to be called "Parts", much to the protest of Fiveson. Eventually the two titles were combined to make it Parts: The Clonus Horror.  The Clonus compound was shot at the then new campus for Moorpark College in Moorpark, California.

Release
Box office gross for the film in the United Kingdom at the end of 1979 ended at £1,680,000. By November 1979, the film grossed nearly $3,000,000.

The film has been released by Mondo Macabro under the title Clonus.

Reception
Blockbuster Entertainment gave the film two stars, calling it an "Interesting suspenser." Leonard Maltin's Movie Guide also gave it two stars, describing it as "Watchable, but uninspired". VideoHound's Golden Movie Retriever by Jim Craddock gave it one and a half stars. John Kenneth Muir called it "A compelling low-budget film that despite lapses in taste and style has the sweet odor of paranoia all over it." Robert C. Trussell for The Kansas City Star praised the cast and its social commentary, saying it deserved cult classic status. Linda Gross from The Los Angeles Times gave praise to the film's cinematography and art direction.

Fangoria gave it three stars. While criticizing the acting and writing as "awkward", praise was given for its political subtext in the film. Time Out called the film a "Competent and engrossing sci-fi thriller in the Coma vein", speaking positively of its ethics. TV Guide gave the movie two stars, saying it was undermined by its budget and was derivative of Coma, Logan's Run, and These Are the Damned. In 1980, the film won the "Best Film Produced for Under $500,000" category at the 7th Saturn Awards.

Mystery Science Theater 3000
Parts: The Clonus Horror was featured in an eighth-season episode of Mystery Science Theater 3000 (MST3K), a comedy television series whose premise is that the character Mike Nelson and his two robot friends Crow T. Robot and Tom Servo are forced to watch bad films as part of an ongoing scientific experiment. The episode aired on the Sci-Fi Channel in June 1997. In 2007, Rhino Video released the MST3K episode as part of the "Volume 12" DVD collection of the series along with The Rebel Set, Secret Agent Super Dragon, and The Starfighters. The DVD release of the MST3K episode includes an interview with Fiveson, who discusses the production of Clonus and the Island lawsuit. Though hesitant about it for the first five minutes, director Robert Fiveson said that he felt "honored" that the film made it onto the show. Shout! Factory re-released the boxset in 2019.

Lawsuit
The big-budget 2005 DreamWorks production The Island, also about a colony that breeds clones to harvest organs for the elite, mirrors Clonus in a number of ways. The makers of Clonus filed suit, claiming copyright infringement. On August 25, 2006, the court presiding over this case ruled that it could proceed to trial. When asked about the similarities, former MST3K host Mike Nelson called The Island a "pale copy of Parts: The Clonus Horror."

According to a 2007 interview with Clonus screenwriter Bob Sullivan, DreamWorks and Clonus Associates reached a settlement, the specific terms of which are sealed. According to Sullivan, the amount settled on was in the seven-figure range.

References

Citations

Bibliography

External links
 

“Clonus” Producers File Suit
Court documents from “Clonus Associates v. Dreamworks, LLC et al.”

1979 films
American science fiction horror films
American dystopian films
1979 horror films
Films about cloning
1970s science fiction horror films
Films about organ transplantation
Films set in deserts
Moorpark College
1970s English-language films
1970s American films